The nitridogermanates are chemical compounds containing germanium atoms bound to nitrogen. The simplest anion is GeN48−, but these are often condensed, with the elimination of nitrogen.

Nitridogermanates can form quite a few structures. Germanium can be in three different oxidation states. In the +2 oxidation state there is [GeIIN2]4− which has a boomerang shape. The most common is the +4 state with [GeIVN3]5− is a planar three pointed star,  and [GeIVN4]8− as tetrahedra. Condensation of the tetrahedra yields [Ge2 IVN6]10−. The +3 state is rare, and represented by [GeIII 2N6]12− with a covalent bond between the two germanium atoms. A few compounds also contain germanium in negative oxidation states −2 and −4 and so can be considered germanides as well.

Synthesis
Reduced compounds may be produced by using a flux of molten sodium. Nitrogen may be introduced by using sodium azide. Alkaline earth elements increase the solubility of nitrogen in molten sodium. Containers can be made from sealed tubes of niobium or tantalum. The sodium can be evaporated by heating to over 300°C in a vacuum.

Properties 
Nitridogermanates tend to be unstable in air, as they react with water vapour to form ammonia.

Related
Nitridogermanates are in the category of nitridotetralates, or more generally nitridometallates, tetrel pnictides or pnictidometallates. Related compounds include the nitridosilicates, and rare nitridostannates. By varying the pnictogen, there are also the phosphidogermanates. Other similar compounds are the nitridogallates and nitridomanganates.

Subtypes may be termed nitridoalumogermanates or nitridomagnesogermanates, if they contain aluminium or magnesium.

List

References

Germanium compounds
Nitrides